Trumer Pils is a pilsner beer from Austria, originally sold almost exclusively in the federal state of Salzburg. A brewery in Berkeley, California, was built in 2004 to provide beer for the U.S. market.

Trumer is characterized by hoppy bitterness, high carbonation and a light body and is brewed according to the German Reinheitsgebot.

History
Trumer Brauerei has been brewing beer for 400 years in Austria. Pilsner beer was first brewed in 1842 in the city of Pilsen, in what was then western Bohemia, but is today Plzen, Czech Republic.

After opening a brewery in Berkeley, Trumer Pils became widely available in the San Francisco Bay Area in addition to its native Austria, the result of a partnership between Privatbrauerei Josef Sigl and the Gambrinus Company. All ingredients used in Berkeley are shipped from Austria with the exception of the water which is from the High Sierras. Hops used in the recipe include Czech Saaz, German Hallertau Perle, and Spalt Select. Trumer is aged six weeks prior to bottling.

Trumer Pils has won many major awards including:
The European Beer Star competition, which has been organised by the association Private Brauereien since 2004.
The World Beer Cup (USA), which claims to be "The Olympics of Beer Competition", is an international beer competition. 
The AIBA 9Australian International Beer Awards

Distribution

Since 2004, Trumer Pils has expanded its distribution to Seattle, Portland, Chicago, Dallas, Austin, Denver, San Diego and Los Angeles.
Trumer Australia, has been distributing Trumer Pils to the Australian market since the early 2000s

Recognition
Gold medal at the World Beer Cup for Best German-style pilsner, 2016.
Silver medal at the World Beer Cup for Best German-style pilsner, 2010.
Gold medal at the World Beer Cup for Best German-style pilsner, 2008.
Gold medal at the World Beer Cup for Best German-style pilsner, 2006.
Silver Medal 2016 Australian International Beer Awards (AIBA) German Style Pilsner.
Trophy for Best Pilsner & Gold Medal at the 2015 Australian International Beer Awards (AIBA) German Style Pilsner (Best Pilsner).
Silver Medal 2014 Australian International Beer Awards (AIBA) German Style Pilsner.
Silver Medal 2013 Australian International Beer Awards (AIBA) German Style Pilsner.
Silver Medal 2012 Australian International Beer Awards (AIBA) German Style Pilsner.
Gold Medal 2010 Australian International Beer Awards (AIBA) Pilsner.
Bronze Medal 2009 Australian International Beer Awards (AIBA) Pilsner.
Silver Medal 2008 Australian International Beer Awards (AIBA) Pilsner.
Gold Medal at the European Beer Star for Best German-style pilsner 2012.
Bronze Medal at the European Beer Star for Best German-style pilsner 2009.
Gold Medal at the European Beer Star for Best German-style pilsner 2008.
Gold Medal at the European Beer Star for Best German-style pilsner 2006.
Gold Medal at the European Beer Star for Best German-style pilsner 2004.
Gold medal at the Great American Beer Festival for Best German-style pilsner, 2010.
Silver medal at the Great American Beer Festival for Best German-style pilsner, 2005.

See also
 California breweries
 Austrian Beer
 Steinkrug

References

External links
Official Website

Beer in Austria
Beer brewing companies based in the San Francisco Bay Area